The European Chess Union (ECU) is an independent association for the interests of European chess.

Board members 

 Zurab Azmaiparashvili – President
 Ion-Serban Dobronauteanu – Deputy President
 Finnbjorn Vang – Vice President
 Theodoros Tsorbatzoglou – Secretary General
 Martin Huba – Treasurer
 Adrian Mikhalchishin – Board Member
 Johann Poecksteiner – Board Member
 Jean-Michel Rapaire – Board Member
 Petr Pisk – Tournament Director

ECU presidents

1985-1986 Rolf Littorin, Sweden

1986-1998 Kurt Jungwirth, Austria

1998-2010 Boris Kutin, Slovenia

2010-2014 Silvio Danailov, Bulgaria

2014- Zurab Azmaiparashvili, Georgia

Member federations 

 Albania – Federata Shqiptare e Shahut
 Andorra – Federació d'Escacs Valls d'Andorra
 Armenia – Հայաստանի շախմատի ֆեդերացիա
 Austria – Österreichischer Schachbund
 Azerbaijan – Azərbaycan Şahmat Federasiyası
 Belarus – Белорусская Федерация  Шахмат   Suspended  
 Belgium – Koninklijke Belgische Schaakbond / Fédération Royale Belge des Echecs / Königlicher Schachbund Belgien
 Bosnia and Herzegovina – Šahovska unija Bosne i Hercegovine / Шаховска унија Босне и Херцеговине
 Bulgaria – Българска федерация по шахмат
 Croatia – Hrvatski šahovski savez
 Cyprus – Κυπριακή Σκακιστική Ομοσπονδία
 Czech Republic – Šachový svaz České republiky
 Denmark – Dansk Skak Union
 England – English Chess Federation (ECF)
 Estonia – Eesti Maleliit
 Faroe Islands – Talvsamband Føroya
 Finland – Suomen Keskusshakkiliitto
 France – Féderation Française des Échecs
 Georgia – საქართველოს ჭადრაკის ფედერაცია
 Germany – Deutscher Schachbund
 Greece – Ελληνική Σκακιστική Ομοσπονδία
 Guernsey – Guernsey Chess Federation
 Hungary – Magyar Sakkszövetség
 Iceland – Skáksamband Íslands
 Ireland – Irish Chess Union
 Israel – איגוד השחמט הישראלי
 Italy – Federazione Scacchistica Italiana (FSI)
 Jersey – Jersey Chess Federation
 Kosovo – Federata e Shahut e Kosovës / Šahovska unija Kosovo
 Latvia – Latvijas Šaha savienība
 Liechtenstein – Liechtensteiner Schachverband
 Lithuania – Lietuvos šachmatų federacijos
 Luxemburg – Féderation Luxembourgeoise des Échecs
 Malta – Il-Federazzjoni Maltija taċ-Ċess
 Moldova – Federația de Șah a Republicii Moldova
 Monaco – Fédération Monégasque des Échecs
 Montenegro – Šahovski savez Crne Gore / Шаховски савез Црне Горе
 Netherlands – Koninklijke Nederlandse Schaakbond
 North Macedonia – Шаховската федерација на Македонија
 Norway – Norges Sjakkforbund
 Poland – Polski Związek Szachowy
 Portugal – Federação Portuguesa de Xadrez
 Romania – Federatia Romana de Sah
 San Marino – Federazione Sammarinese degli Scacchi
 Scotland – Chess Scotland
 Serbia – Šahovski savez Srbije / Шаховски савез Србије
 Slovakia – Slovenský šachový zväz
 Slovenia – Šahovska zveza Slovenije
 Spain – Federacion Española de Ajedrez
 Sweden – Sveriges Schackförbund
 Switzerland – Fédération Suisse des Échecs / Schweizerischer Schachbund / Federazione Scacchista Svizzera / Federaziun Svizra da Schah / Swiss Chess Federation
 Turkey – Türkiye Satranç Federasyonu
 Ukraine – Федерація шахів України
 Wales – Welsh Chess Union

Belarus was suspended on 5 March 2022 in response to the 2022 Russian invasion of Ukraine. Russia (Russian Chess Federation) withdrew from the European Chess Union on 14 April 2022, with the possibility of joining the Asian Chess Federation in mind. Both Countries were banned from attending the 2022 Chess Olympiad.

ECU tournaments

Individual championships 

 European Individual Championship
 European Individual Championship for Women
 European Youth Championship
 European Senior Championship
 European Amateur Championship
 EU Individual Open Championship
 EU Youth Championship
 European Rapid Championship
 European Rapid Championship for Women
 European Blitz Championship
 European Blitz Championship for Women
 European Universities Chess Championship

Team championships 

 European Team Championship
 European Team Championship for Women
 European Youth Team Championship
 European Senior Team Championship
 European Club Cup
 European Small Nations Team Chess Championship

References

External links 
 

Chess organizations
Organizations based in Europe
Chess in Europe